The Chevrolet Corsica (named after Corsica, France) is a front-wheel drive compact car that was produced by Chevrolet from 1987 until 1996. The Corsica was built upon the L-body platform. It shared the L-body with the 2-door Beretta, and the rebadged revival of the Pontiac Tempest which was essentially the same car, but was only sold in Canada. The Corsica came in two styles and four trims. Sold initially only as a 4-door sedan, it was also available as a 5-door hatchback from model years 1989 until 1991. Corsicas were built alongside the Beretta by both the Wilmington Assembly in Delaware and Linden Assembly in New Jersey.

Year-to-year changes

1987–1989
The Corsica was first sold as a fleet car to rental agencies and large companies in 1987, prior to mainstream release. The Corsica and Beretta were the second best-selling passenger cars in America in calendar year 1988, right behind the Ford Escort. Much of the suspension components were borrowed from the J-body Chevrolet Cavalier, and the chassis was an extension of that of the J-body, but modeled with similar proportions to the N-body. The L-body platform however, was engineered by Chevrolet rather than Oldsmobile. The car was equipped with either the 2.0 L TBI OHV I4 from the Cavalier, or the 2.8 L MPFI OHV V6 from the Chevrolet Celebrity. The base Corsica's door handles were colored silver, while the Corsica LT/LTZ had black-colored handles. Some earlier models had a column shifter with a handbrake between the front seats, an uncommon configuration for most compact cars of the time. A 5-door hatchback model was introduced for 1989, as was an LTZ performance package that included many suspension parts from the Beretta.  A rare XT trim included all the performance parts from the LTZ trim as well as a leather interior, special body kit and spoiler package designed for GM by a third party supplier.

1990
The base model Corsica was dropped, leaving the LT and LTZ. Both engines offered were increased in displacement. The Corsica now either used the same 2.2 L 4-cylinder engine and 3-speed automatic transmission as the Cavalier, or the 3.1 L V6 and 3-speed automatic from the Lumina. Minor changes were made to the interior, mostly around the driver controls.

1991

For 1991 the Corsica received an extensively updated interior with a standard driver's side airbag and cup holders. The front seatbelts were moved from the doors to the B-pillars. The taillights also received a redesign, going from smooth to ridged. This would also be the last year for the five-door hatchback.

1992

The only trim level was the LT. The manual transmission was dropped for the V6; it remained available for the four-cylinder engine, although it was only available through special order (few of which ever took place). The 2.2 L OHV engine was now upgraded with sequential fuel-injection (SFI) in the Corsica, unlike the version in the Cavalier which used multi-point fuel injection (MPFI).

1993
On automatic transmission vehicles, a shift interlock, which required the brake pedal to be applied before the transmission could be taken out of the park position, as well as a low oil level light was added. The 3.1 L V6 equipped cars also lost the "3.1L Multi-Port V6" fender badge.

1994
The LT model took the place of the base model once again. The 2.2 L engine's power output was increased to 120 hp. The 3.1 L V6 was replaced with the updated Gen III "3100-series" engine (Option code L82) with an output of 160 hp along with an OBD-1.5 System. This new OBD system was not compatible with either OBD-I or OBD-II but included some features from both systems.

The air conditioning system was upgraded to use R-134a refrigerant, replacing the environmentally-harmful R-12.

The 3-speed automatic transmission on V6 models was replaced with a 4-speed electronically-controlled automatic transmission with overdrive, and lubricated with 100,000 mile long-life fluid. The 2.2 L engine retained the same 3-speed automatic, but the 4-speed automatic could be special ordered. The front seat belts were moved from the B-pillars to the doors. The manual transmission was also dropped for all US Corsicas this model year, due to lack of consumer demand, although many export models and the Beretta still retained this option.

1995

The Corsica became the first American car to be equipped with daytime running lights as a standard feature.  A new Corsica logo was introduced along with other minor cosmetic exterior changes, such as the introduction of body-colored mirrors, side moldings, and grille. The car also received a revised rear suspension, similar to that of the then-newly redesigned Cavalier. This slightly reduced the "floatiness" of the ride which occurred with earlier models. All Corsicas now came with Dex-Cool engine coolant. The car also received a new tire size, 195/70R14 for longer tire life and better handling.

1996
The Corsica was converted fully to OBD-II. GM discontinued the Corsica and the Chevrolet Beretta after the 1996 model year, due to safety standards in 1997 that would have required a total redesign of these cars, and competition from the similarly sized redesigned Chevrolet Cavalier for compact car sales. The Corsica was replaced by the larger Chevrolet Malibu for the 1997 model year.

Production ended on June 26, 1996.

Production Figures:

Engines

Notes:
Both the 2.8 L V6 and 2.0 L I4 received a longer stroke crankshaft in the 1990 model year, respectively increasing their displacements to 3.1 L and 2.2 L.
In the 1992 model year, sequential fuel injection replaced throttle-body injection on the I4 and in 1994 it replaced MPFI on the V6 models.  The updated OBD system is sometimes referred to as OBD 1.5.

References

External links

 Consumer Guide: 1990-1996 Chevrolet Corsica Consumer Guide Used Car review of the Chevrolet Corsica
 Chevrolet Corsica / Beretta Europe

Corsica
Compact cars
Front-wheel-drive vehicles
Hatchbacks
Sedans
1980s cars
1990s cars
Motor vehicles manufactured in the United States
Cars introduced in 1987
Cars discontinued in 1996